The 2010 Grand Prix Hassan II was a men's tennis tournament played on outdoor clay courts. It was the 26th edition of the Grand Prix Hassan II, and an ATP Tour World 250 event on the 2010 ATP World Tour. It was the 26th edition of the tournament and took place at the Complexe Al Amal in Casablanca, Morocco, from 5 April through 11 April 2010. `First-seeded Stan Wawrinka won the singles title.

Entrants

Seeds

 Rankings and seedings are as of March 22, 2010.

Other entrants
The following players received wildcards into the main draw:
  Reda El Amrani
  Paul-Henri Mathieu
  Mehdi Ziadi

The following players received entry via qualifying:
  Martin Kližan
  Stefan Koubek
  Iván Navarro
  Jarkko Nieminen

Finals

Singles

 Stan Wawrinka defeated  Victor Hănescu, 6–2, 6–3
 It was Wawrinka's first title of the year (and first in 4 years) and second title of his career.

Doubles

 Robert Lindstedt /  Horia Tecău defeated  Rohan Bopanna /  Aisam-ul-Haq Qureshi, 6–2, 3–6, [10–7]

External links
Official website

 
Grand Prix Hassan II
Grand Prix Hassan II